Idiosepius is a genus of mollusk in the family Idiosepiidae. Members of this genus represent no interest to commercial fisheries.

Species
Idiosepius hallami Reid & Strugnell, 2018
Idiosepius minimus (d'Orbigny in Férussac & d'Orbigny, 1835)
Idiosepius paradoxus (Ortmann, 1888)
Idiosepius picteti (Joubin, 1894)
Idiosepius pygmaeus Steenstrup, 1881
Idiosepius thailandicus Chotiyaputta, Okutani & Chaitiamvong, 1991

References

von Boletzky, S., et al. 2005.   Phuket mar. biol. Cent. Res. Bull. 66: 11–22.

External links

Cephalopod genera